Oxynoemacheilus merga, Krynicki's loach, is a species of stone loach from the genus Oxynoemacheilus. It is found in the western drainage basin of the Caspian Sea in eastern Europe in the upper mountain streams of the drainage systems of the Kuma, Terek, Sulak, Shura-ozen and Samur where it is abundant. The countries in which it occurs are Azerbaijan, Georgia and Russia.

References

Kottelat, M. and J. Freyhof, 2007. Handbook of European freshwater fishes. Publications Kottelat, Cornol and Freyhof, Berlin. 646 pp.

merga
Taxa named by Johann Krynicki
Fish described in 1840
Fish of Europe